Balasaheb Poonchwale (1918–2005) was a Hindustani classical vocalist and leading figure of the Gwalior gharana. The son and disciple of Raja Bhaiya Poonchwale, he also learned from celebrated musicologists Vishnu Narayan Bhatkhande and S. N. Ratanjankar. Regarded for his role as a music educator, Poonchwale's disciples include Raja Kale, Biswajeet Roy Chowdhury, Shashwati Mandal, and Samarth Nagarkar.

References 

1918 births
2005 deaths
Hindustani singers
People from Gwalior
Indian music educators
20th-century Indian male classical singers
Bhajan singers
20th-century Indian educators
Recipients of the Sangeet Natak Akademi Award